India Development Foundation of Overseas Indians (IDF-OI) www.idfoi.nic.in is a not for profit Trust established in 2008 by Government of India with the approval of the Cabinet to serve as a credible institutional avenue to enable overseas Indians to engage in philanthropy to supplement India's social and development efforts. The New Delhi-based Trust is chaired by Sushma Swaraj, Minister for External Affairs and is exempt from the provisions of Foreign Contribution (Regulation) Act, 2010 (FCRA).

According to Smt. Sushma Swaraj the Indian diaspora is a very heterogeneous group and there is a common factor which binds them- their desire to maintain connection with their homeland and to contribute to the social and development efforts in India. IDF-OI seeks to strengthen and deepen this relationship.IDF-OI”.

The  Chairperson of the IDF-OI Board of Trustees is Smt. Sushma Swaraj, Minister for External Affairs, the Vice Chairman is Shri Dnyaneshwar M. Mulay, Secretary (OIA and CPV) Ministry of External Affairs and the CEO is Smt. Vani Rao, Joint Secretary (OIA), Ministry of External Affairs. Other Board members are prominent Overseas Indians and eminent Indians who have an active interest in philanthropy.

Board Members

Eminent Overseas Indians

 Dr Bharat Haridas Barai- Medical Director of the Cancer Institute, Methodist Hospitals, Indiana, USA
 Mr. Yusuff Ali M.A.- Chairman and Managing Director, Lulu International, UAE
 Mr. Y. Sudhir Shetty- President, UAE Exchange Centre, UAE
 Mr. Govind Sovale- President, Indo-Swiss Center, Switzerland.

Eminent Resident Indians

 Sri Sri Ravi Shankar- President, The Art of Living
 Mr. Vara Prasad Rongala- Managing Director, Invensis Technologies
 Mr. Ashwini Vaishnaw- Managing Director, GE Transportation
 Swami Chidanand Saraswati- President, Parmarth Niketan Ashram

Ex-Officio Members

 Shri Rajiv Mehrishi, Home Secretary, Ministry of Home Affairs
 Shri Shaktikanta Das, Secretary, Dept of Economic Affairs
 Dr. S. Jaishankar, Foreign Secretary
 Shri Amitabh Kant, CEO, Niti Aayog
IDF-OI Board of Trustees

Mandate

In 2015, IDF-OI’s mandate was revised to channelize contributions from Overseas Indians towards Government’s flagship programmes – National Mission for Clean Ganga; Swachh Bharat Mission, and social and development projects of by State Governments.

The Swachh Bharat Mission (Clean India Mission), a national campaign by the Government of India, aims to accomplish the vision of a 'Clean India' by October 2, 2019, the 150th birthday of Mahatma Gandhi. Similarly, the National Mission for Clean Ganga aims to integrate the efforts to clean and protect the river Ganga.

IDF-OI is also partnering with the State Govts to select projects identified by the State Governments and seek Overseas Indians’ engagement with these projects.

Objectives of the Trust

 Lead overseas Indian philanthropy into India. 
 Establish and maintain a 'Social Capital and Philanthropy Network' in India that can provide a list of credible institutions, projects and 
programmes.
 Partner with States in India and encourage credible Indian philanthropic organisations
 Promote accountability and 'good practices' in Diaspora philanthropy.

Periodical written reports & photographs on progress in project and outcomes is sent to contributors by recipient organisations through IDF-OI.

Projects Funded

In 2011, IDF-OI facilitated contributions from Overseas Indians for social development projects in states like Assam, Rajasthan & Gujarat and raised funds in areas of rainwater harvesting, educating and mainstreaming differently abled children, women’s education and sustainable livelihood.

IDF-OI has collected over 88 projects from 15 States i.e. Rajasthan, Maharashtra, Madhya Pradesh, West Bengal, Karnataka, Odisha, Tripura, Sikkim, Mizoram, Bihar, Chhattisgarh, Uttarakhand, Punjab, Jammu and Kashmir, Andhra Pradesh in areas of Sanitation, Education, Women and Child Development, Sustainable Livelihood, and Healthcare.

Since January 2016, 73 Overseas Indians have contributed to IDF-OI. Projects implemented through contributions received from Overseas Indians in 2016 are as follows:
 One Community Toilet in Vijayawada, Andhra Pradesh
 One Community Toilet in Varadaraja Nagar, Tirupati, Andhra Pradesh
Projects under implementation:
 Construction of One Public Toilet in Ram Bagh Garden Amritsar, Punjab
 Construction of Community Sanitary Complex in Gangtok, Sikkim IDF-OI Projects 
 
Funds have been allocated to projects in Maharashtra, Odisha, Madhya Pradesh, Rajasthan and Jammu & Kashmir. Implementation will commence shortly.

Online Payment Gateway

To enable small and regular contributions to projects and to IDF-OI Pool fund, an online Payment Gateway was launched by Smt. Sushma Swaraj, Minister of External Affairs on 31 July 2016. The Payment Gateway accepts a minimum contribution of USD 100 or its equivalent in other foreign currencies into the IDF-OI Pool Fund; or the minimum contribution for project specific funding is the unit cost of the project.

IDF-OI does not charge/deduct any administrative cost from the contributions received from Overseas Indians. Pool Fund

References

2008 establishments in India
Government agencies established in 2008
Overseas Indian organisations